The 2009 Brumos Porsche 250 was the seventh round of the 2009 Rolex Sports Car Series season. It took place at Daytona International Speedway on July 4, 2009.

Race results
Class Winners in bold.

Brumos Porsche 250